The CNRS Gold Medal  is the highest scientific research award in France. It is presented annually by the French National Centre for Scientific Research (CNRS) and was first awarded in 1954. Moreover, the CNRS Silver Medal is given to researchers for originality, quality, and importance, while the CNRS Bronze Medal recognizes initial fruitful results.

Gold medal recipients

 1954 Émile Borel – Mathematics
 1955 Louis de Broglie – Physics
 1956 Jacques Hadamard – Mathematics
 1957 Gaston Dupouy – Physics
 1958 Gaston Ramon – Immunology
 1959 André Danjon – Astrophysics
 1960 Raoul Blanchard – Geography
 1961 Pol Bouin – Physiology
 1962 Marcel Delépine – Chemistry
 1963 Robert Courrier – Biology
 1964 Alfred Kastler – Physics
 1965 Louis Néel – Physics
 1966 Paul Pascal – Chemistry
 1967 Claude Lévi-Strauss – Ethnology
 1968 Boris Ephrussi – Genetics
 1969 Georges Chaudron – Chemistry
 1970 Jacques Friedel – Physics
 1971 Bernard Halpern – Immunology
 1972 Jacques Oudin – Immunology
 1973 André Leroi-Gourhan – Ethnology
 1974 Edgar Lederer – Biochemistry
 1975 Raymond Castaing – Physics, and Christiane Desroches Noblecourt – Egyptology
 1976 Henri Cartan – Mathematics
 1977 Charles Fehrenbach – Astronomy
 1978 Maurice Allais – Economics, and Pierre Jacquinot – Physics
 1979 Pierre Chambon – Biology
 1980 Pierre-Gilles De Gennes – Physics
 1981 Jean-Marie Lehn – Chemistry, and Roland Martin – Archaeology
 1982 Pierre Joliot – Biochemistry
 1983 Evry Schatzman – Astrophysics
 1984 Jean Brossel – Physics, and Jean-Pierre Vernant – History
 1985 Piotr Slonimski – Genetics
 1986 Nicole Le Douarin – Embryology
 1987 Georges Canguilhem – Philosophy, and Jean-Pierre Serre – Mathematics
 1988 Philippe Nozieres – Physics
 1989 Michel Jouvet – Biology
 1990 Marc Julia – Chemistry
 1991 Jacques Le Goff – History
 1992 Jean-Pierre Changeux – Neurobiology
 1993 Pierre Bourdieu – Sociology
 1994 Claude Allègre – Geophysics
 1995 Claude Hagège – Linguistics
 1996 Claude Cohen-Tannoudji – Physics
 1997 Jean Rouxel – Chemistry
 1998 Pierre Potier – Chemistry
 1999 Jean-Claude Risset – Computer-Music
 2000 Michel Lazdunski – Biochemistry
 2001 Maurice Godelier – Anthropology
 2002 Claude Lorius – Climatology, and Jean Jouzel – Climatology
 2003 Albert Fert – Physics
 2004 Alain Connes – Mathematics
 2005 Alain Aspect – Physics
 2006 Jacques Stern – Computer-Sciences
 2007 Jean Tirole – Economics
 2008 Jean Weissenbach – Genetics
 2009 Serge Haroche – Physics
 2010 Gérard Férey – Chemistry
 2011 Jules A. Hoffmann – Biology
 2012 Philippe Descola – Anthropology
 2013 Margaret Buckingham – Developmental Biology
 2014 Gérard Berry – Computer-Sciences 
 2015 Éric Karsenti – Biology 
 2016 Claire Voisin – Mathematics
 2017 Alain Brillet – Physics, and Thibault Damour – Physics 
 2018 Barbara Cassin – Philosophy
 2019 Thomas Ebbesen – Physical chemistry
 2020 Françoise Combes – Astrophysics
 2021 Jean Dalibard – Physics
 2022 Jean-Marie Tarascon – Chemistry

Notes

References

External links
 
 

Awards established in 1954
French National Centre for Scientific Research awards
1954 establishments in France